Chester Friary of the Sack was a friary in Cheshire, England.

Monasteries in Cheshire